Qualification for the boxing events at the 2015 European Games will begin in June 2014. Nations are limited to one entry per weight division. Azerbaijan will have host nation positions available in each weight category.

Qualification rules

Men's
NOC's will be awarded quota places by EUBC and AIBA based on historical data of previous European Championships.

Women's
In the women's events, the EUBC European Women’s Boxing Championships in Bucharest, Romania will be the official qualification event after which European ranking will be established by 30 June 2014. If an NOC has more than one athlete in the top 14, the next best ranked NOC will get the allocation. 2 other place per weight category are reserved for 'universality' and host nominations. Moreover, the top five European athletes in the 75 kg class at the 2014 AIBA Women's World Boxing Championships in South Korea will earn a quota place.

Qualification timeline

Qualification summary

References

Qualification
Qualification for the 2015 European Games